A leadership election was held by the People's Justice Party (PKR) in Malaysia from April to July 2022 to elect new leadership on the central level.  

For the party presidency, it was highly unlikely for incumbent president Anwar Ibrahim to face any potential opponents and being defeated and he would hence remain as the party president given to his prominent and dominant position in the party and politics following the departure of former deputy president Azmin Ali, his followers and a number of founding members aligned to Azmin whom they were embroiled in splits and fallouts with Anwar and eventually resulted in the 2020–2022 Malaysian political crisis which overthrew the democratically elected Pakatan Harapan (PH) administration. 2018 PKR election was repeated with Anwar remaining as the party president after he was elected by walkover as he was the sole candidate for the party presidency in the election. 

For the party deputy presidency, it was expected to see a heated contest and fight between Rafizi Ramli, former candidate and loser to Azmin in 2018 and the incumbent vice-president, who announced his return to active politics on 15 March 2022, and Saifuddin Nasution Ismail, also a former candidate and loser to Azmin in 2014, the loyalist to Anwar and the incumbent secretary-general. Subsequently, on 29 May 2022, Rafizi defeated Saifuddin with an unexpected landslide victory in the unofficial results revealed. Saifuddin then conceded defeat and congratulated Rafizi on winning the PKR deputy presidency at night on the same day.  On 4 July 2022, the results of the forensic audit of the unofficial results were revealed with a major change of the overturn of the victory in the contest for the position of Women Chief with initial winner Rodziah Ismail being edged out extremely narrowly by her opponent Fadhlina Sidek by a majority of mere 32 votes. Fadhlina was then declared the new Women Chief-elect. The rest of the results remained almost the same as the initial ones and no other major changes took place. The audit was done following complaints and allegations of the lack of freedom, fairness and transparency by some of the candidates.

Timeline

Nominations & Results

President

Deputy President

Vice Presidents

Women Chief

Deputy Women Chief

Youth Chief (AMK)

Deputy Youth Chief

Central Leadership Council (MPP)

References 

2022 elections in Malaysia
People's Justice Party leadership election
People's Justice Party leadership elections